Dear White People is a 2014 American satirical dark comedy-drama film written, directed and co-produced by Justin Simien. The film focuses on escalating racial tensions at a fictitious, prestigious Ivy League college from the perspective of several black students. It stars Tyler James Williams, Tessa Thompson, Kyle Gallner, Teyonah Parris, Brandon P. Bell, Brittany Curran, Marque Richardson and Dennis Haysbert.

The film premiered in competition in the US Dramatic Category at 2014 Sundance Film Festival on January 18, 2014. The film had a theatrical release in United States on October 17, 2014. A commercial and critical success, the film profited at the box office and received positive reviews from many professional critics. It has also been nominated for and has received several awards.

In 2017, the film was adapted into a Netflix series of the same name, also with Simien's involvement. Like the film, the series has also enjoyed critical acclaim.

Plot
Samantha White, a media arts major at the fictional Winchester University, causes a stir at the prestigious and predominantly white school by criticizing white people and the racist transgressions at Winchester in her sharp-tongued, witty radio show Dear White People and her self-published book, Ebony and Ivy. Tensions rise when Sam runs to become head of house of Armstrong/Parker, the historically-black house on campus. She is opposed by Troy Fairbanks, an ex-boyfriend who harbors dreams of being a comedic writer, but who is pressed by his father, the school's dean, to become a lawyer, to not give white people a chance to profile him, and to give nothing less than his best. Coco is trying to persuade a reality TV producer to do a show on her, but he would prefer to highlight the light-skinned Sam. Lionel Higgins, a black gay student, gets a chance to find his place at Winchester by being recruited by the school's most prestigious student newspaper to write a piece on Sam and the black experience at Winchester. When Kurt, a white student and son of the school's president, and his club throw a blackface party in response to Sam's outspoken show, black students appear at the party, and a brawl ensues.

Cast

 Tyler James Williams as Lionel Higgins
 Tessa Thompson as Samantha "Sam" White
 Kyle Gallner as Kurt Fletcher
 Teyonah Parris as Collandrea "Coco" Conners
 Brandon P. Bell as Troy Fairbanks
 Brittany Curran as Sofia Fletcher
 Justin Dobies as Gabe
 Marque Richardson as Reggie
 Malcolm Barrett as Helmut West
 Dennis Haysbert as Dean Fairbanks
 Peter Syvertsen as President Fletcher
 Brandon Alter as George
 Kate Gaulke as Annie
 Brian James as Martin
 Keith Myer as Mitch
 Bryan Daniel Porter as Gordon
 Terry Hempleman as Professor Bodkin
 Naomi Ko as Sungmi
 Ashley Blaine Featherson as Curls
 Jemar Michael as Smoothe
 Courtney Sauls as Wild

Development
Simien spent five years writing the script beginning in 2007. The next year, he made a trailer to promote and gain attention and funds for his project, which went viral. He also launched a campaign at Indiegogo to raise $25,000 but he got an overwhelming response and managed to raise $40,000 instead.

The project won IndieWire's Project of the Year title and Simien was later invited to 2013 Tribeca Film Festival to participate in Filmmaker/Industry meetings hosted by the festival. Talking about Tribeca Film Festival, Simien said that "we had a lot of meetings with a lot of studios. We had a lot of conversations with studios and distributors and basically, we decided that the best offer on the table was from an independent financier, Julie Lebedev of Code Red Films. To make it independently, that was really the dream -- because then we could make the movie we wanted to make."

Filming
Principal photography took place in late September 2013 in Minnesota, including at the University of Minnesota and other locations in Minneapolis and Saint Paul, and in Los Angeles, including the UCLA campus. The filming was completed in 19 days. Simien shot the film with Red Epic digital camera and said that "I would love to shoot on film. I don't believe it's completely dead, but this format made a lot of sense for our production."

Release

Box office
Dear White People grossed $347,959 in its first weekend in only 11 theaters. It went on to earn $4,404,154 in a limited theatrical run, finishing as the 3rd highest-grossing film to come out of the 2014 Sundance Film Festival.

Critical response

Review aggregator Rotten Tomatoes gave the film an approval rating of 91% based on 130 reviews, with an average rating of 7.47/10. The site's critical consensus reads "Dear White People adds a welcome new voice to cinema's oft-neglected discussion of race, tackling its timely themes with intelligence, honesty, and gratifyingly sharp wit." On Metacritic, the film has a score of 79 out of 100, based on 32 critics, indicating "generally favorable reviews".

Justin Chang, in his review for Variety, said that the film "provokes admiration for having bothered to ask some of the hard questions without pretending to know any of the answers" and praising the cast said that "Williams, Thompson, Parris and Bell all make strong, distinctive impressions, with Thompson perhaps the standout as the film’s sharpest and most enigmatic figure." Justin Lowe of The Hollywood Reporter praised the performances of cast, saying, "Thompson’s conflicted student activist, which she pulls off with practiced composure. Williams manages to consistently dial up Lionel's nervousness and bewilderment throughout the film to a point of heightened tension that necessitates decisive resolution. As lovers, then rivals who must eventually seek mutual accommodation, Parris and Bell understand that for Coco and Troy, discovering humility is just the beginning of these characters' realigned journeys." He further added, "An edgy premise and memorable cast make for a potent first impression." Zeba Blay of IndieWire gave a positive review and said, "With its vividly drawn world and characters, the movie doesn’t presume to encompass the entirety of what it means to be black, but it does give one of the most entertaining and honest depictions of black life in a so-called “white” world in years." Terence Johnson of ScottFeinberg.com gave a positive review to the film and said that "Dear White People is a perfect film for today’s generation".

Accolades

TV series

On May 5, 2016, Lionsgate announced a deal to produce a series based on the film, distributed through Netflix. This is the second Netflix original program for Lionsgate Television, following Orange Is the New Black.

See also
White People (film)
List of black films of the 2010s

References

External links
 
 
 
 
 
 
 

2014 films
2014 comedy-drama films
2014 LGBT-related films
2010s satirical films
African-American comedy-drama films
African-American LGBT-related films
American LGBT-related films
American satirical films
Films adapted into television shows
Films set in universities and colleges
Films shot in Los Angeles
Films shot in Minnesota
LGBT-related comedy-drama films
Roadside Attractions films
2014 independent films
2014 directorial debut films
2014 comedy films
2010s English-language films
2010s American films